Nineties is a Czech crime television series that serves as a prequel to Případy 1. oddělení. The series is based on real criminal cases investigated by Czech Police. Main characters are based on real life investigators and other people. The cases reflect some of the most famous real criminal cases of the modern Czech Republic (Orlík killers). Nineties became most watched Czech TV series since 2004 with average viewership of 2.23 millions viewers older 15 years and with an average audience share of 47.51%.

Cast

Main
 Kryštof Bartoš as por. Tomáš Kozák
 Martin Finger as kpt. Václav Plíšek
 Ondřej Sokol as npor. František Tůma
 Vasil Fridrich as mjr. Ivan Pauřík
 Robert Mikluš as npor. Josef Korejs

Supporting
 Patricie Pagáčová as Ivana Kozáková
 Štěpánka Fingerhutová as	prostitute Jana
 Bořek Slezáček as	Alexej
 Kateřina Marešová as Lucie Nováková
 Martin Stránský as plk. Otakar Duchoň
 Pavel Batěk as plk. Martin Zelňák
 Martin Davídek as	kpt. Michal Švarc
 Jan Kolařík as MUDr. Rudolf Beneš
 Daniel Rous as Hacki
 Daniel Margolius as npor. Aleš Dobrý
 Michal Novotný as	Ivan Jonák
 Albert Čuba as František Mrázek
 Richard Němec as Antonín Běla
 Tomáš Turek as Jan Janovský
 Zdeněk Stadtherr as Lumír Verner
 Igor Orozovič as Karel Kopáč
 Matouš Ruml as Ludvík Černý
 Viktor Zavadil as Petr Chodounský
 Jaroslav Tomáš as Vladimír Kuna
 Jakub Štáfek as Jiří Jíva
 David Šír as Miroslav Königsmark
 Tomáš Kobr as Tomáš Jeřábek
 Jiří Křižan as Josef Vrabec
 Marta Falvey Sovová as Ludvika Jonáková
 Jana Provázková as Iveta Suchá
 Karel Jirák as Marcel Štiller
 Michael Aleš Bucifal as Jiří Tokár
 Luboš Balog as Jan Balog
 Tomáš Mrvík as Michal Souček
 Klára Miklasová as Lenka Kulichová
 Anna Janečková Bazgerová as neighbor Marie
 Radek Polák as npor. Rudolf Kovář
 Miroslav Čáslavka as npor. Honza Němec
 Matej Landl as diver Jura
 František Strnad as navigator Saša
 František Večeřa as the lead diver

Episodes

References

External links 
Official site
IMDB site
ČSFD site

Czech crime television series
2022 Czech television series debuts
Czech Television original programming
Prequel television series
Czech television spin-offs
Czech Lion Awards winners (television series)